East Side Community High School is a public school at 420 East 12th Street in the East Village neighborhood of Manhattan in New York City. Founded in 1991, it is for students from the 6th to 12th grade. Its principal is Mark Federman. Girls Prep, a charter school, is housed inside the same building. The building also housed Ross Global Academy, another charter school, until 2011.

Demographics
As of 2010, the racial makeup of East Side Community School consists of 54% Hispanic, 17% Black, 15% White, 10% Asian or Pacific Islander and 4% other.

Controversy
On February 16, 2021, East Side Community High School Principal Mark Federman sent out a survey to White parents asking them to reflect on their "Whiteness". The survey included a list of "The Eight White Identities" such as "White Supremacist", "White Privilege", "White Abolitionist", and "White Traitor". According to Federman, this was done "as part of a series of materials meant for reflection" and as "food for thought". News.com.au noted that the survey "has brought about yet another heated debate regarding racial discourse in America."

References

External links

Educational institutions in the United States with year of establishment missing
Public high schools in Manhattan
Public middle schools in Manhattan
East Village, Manhattan